An adult learner or, more commonly, a mature student, is a person who is older and is involved in forms of learning. Adult learners fall in a specific criterion of being experienced, and do not always have a high school diploma. Many of the adult learners go back to school to finish a degree, or earn a new one.

Malcolm Knowles's work distinguished adult learners as distinct from adolescent and child learners in his principle of andragogy. He established 5 assumptions about the adult learner. This included self-concept, adult learner experience, readiness to learn, orientation to learning, and motivation to learning.

Criteria
In the US, adult learners fall into the category of nontraditional students, whom the National Center for Education Statistics defines as meeting at least one of the following seven criteria:

 Delays enrollment (does not enter post secondary education in the same calendar year that they finished high school).
 Attends part time for at least part of the academic year.
 Works full time (35 hours or more per week) while enrolled.
 Is considered financially independent for purposes of determining eligibility for financial aid.
 Has dependents other than a spouse (usually children, but sometimes others).
 Is a single parent (either not married or married but separated and has dependents).
 Does not have a high school diploma (completed high school with a GED or other high school completion certificate or did not finish high school).

Not all nontraditional students are adult learners, but adult learners are considered nontraditional students. This can be due to the wide range of cultural, job, and educational backgrounds.

In the UK, a student is normally classified as a mature student if they are an (undergraduate) student who is at least 25+ years old at the start of their course, or in the Irish case on the first of January of the year of entry, and usually having been away from school for at least two years. The normal entry requirements for school-leavers wishing to start an undergraduate degree are often not applied to mature students.

In higher education

The impact of a rapidly changing society is reflected in the growing number of adults engaged in a formal part-time course of study at an institution of higher education.

Studies have shown that during the last few decades, there has been a shift from postsecondary degree seekers, from traditional student to a more diverse population who normally work part-time, full-time and/or have family commitments. This phenomenon has created a larger bank of adult learners who attend colleges and who face a myriad of challenges committing to their education.

Adult students are frequently referred to as nontraditional students in higher education. Adult students are contrasted with traditional students, who are typically under 25, attend full-time, do not work full-time when enrolled in courses, and have few, if any, family responsibilities. In 2008, 36 percent of postsecondary students were age 25 or older and 47 percent were independent students.

Special characteristics
Adult learners are considered “in a state of transition”, trying to improve themselves by achieving a higher level of education in order to move up in the professional environment.  Their expectations are greater than those of a traditional student, because they have a better idea of what they want and what they expect from their education.  However, they also have higher levels of anxiety and pressure to fulfill the required expectations in a shorter amount of time, while navigating other responsibilities.

Adult learners typically have more life experiences. When confronted with new knowledge or an experience, adult learners construe new meaning based on their greater life experiences.

Potential challenges faced by adult learners 
There are many challenges faced by adult learners such as family commitments, work, financial barriers, lack of time, support, and a clear understanding of how to balance it all, especially if they still would like to have some kind of social life.

Another big challenge is the ever changing technological world in which we now live. For an adult learner who is past their 40s, they grew up in a world where our dependency in technology was nonexistent. Distant learning was something that was not available, but it is now one of the main sources of adult education.

References

Further reading 
 Brookfield, S. D. (1991). Understanding and Facilitating Adult Learning: A Comprehensive Analysis of Principles and Effective Practices. 2nd edition. Jossey-Bass.
 Crimaldi, Laura, "Older residents follow Pathway to college", Boston Herald, Sunday, January 4, 2009. About students successes in the College Pathways program at ABCD Learning Works in Boston, Massachusetts.
 Galbraith, M. W. (2004). Adult learning methods: a guide for effective instruction. 3rd edition. Krieger Publishing.
 Rogers, Alan, Non-formal Education: Flexible Schooling or Participatory Education?, Springer, 2005.

External links
 Adult Learners and New Traditions in Higher Education — WorldWideLearn.com
 National Center for Education Statistics
 BBC Bitesize with websites including Skillswise and raw

Academia
Age and society
Educational stages
Types of students